Osumilite is a very rare potassium-sodium-iron-magnesium-aluminium silicate mineral. Osumilite is part of the milarite group (also known as the milarite-osumilite group) of cyclosilicates.

Characteristics

It is translucent and the typical coloring is either blue, black, brown, or gray. It displays no cleavage and has a vitreous luster. Osumilite has a hardness between 5-6 on the Mohs hardness scale. 

The hexagonal crystal structure of osumilite is an unusual molecular make-up. Normal cyclosilicate have rings composed of six silicate tetrahedrons; . In a double ring structure, two normal rings are linked by sharing six oxygens, one from each tetrahedron in each six membered ring.

Occurrence

Osumilite, was first discovered as grains in volcanic rocks near Osumi, Japan. It was confused with a similar mineral cordierite because of their similar coloring. It can be found in high-grade metamorphic rocks, xenoliths and in the groundmass of rhyolite and dacite.

Osumilite is found in the Obsidian Cliffs, Oregon; Sardinia, Italy; Kagoshima and Yamanashi Prefecture, Japan; and the Eifel district in Germany. Osumilite pseudomorphs are known from a number of ultrahigh-temperature rocks, including those of southern Madagascar.

See also
List of minerals

References

Magnesium minerals
Iron minerals
Potassium minerals
Aluminium minerals
Cyclosilicates
Hexagonal minerals
Minerals in space group 192